The 1905–06 season was Galatasaray SK's 2nd in existence. Galatasaray SK did not join the IFL.

Squad statistics

Friendly Matches

Kick-off listed in local time (EEST)
Kick-off listed in local time (EEST)

References
 Tekil, Süleyman. Dünden bugüne Galatasaray(1983). Page(53). Arset Matbaacılık Kol.Şti.

External links
 Galatasaray Sports Club Official Website 
 Turkish Football Federation - Galatasaray A.Ş. 
 uefa.com - Galatasaray AŞ

Galatasaray S.K. (football) seasons
Turkish football clubs 1905–06 season
1900s in Istanbul